Baikuntha Manandhar (born 24 December 1951) is a Nepali marathon runner. He competed in four consecutive Olympic Games, from 1976 to 1988. He has won three consecutive gold medals in South Asian Games making a record. His record was broken by Deepak Bista by securing four gold medals consecutively in Taekwondo.

Biography
Manandhar was born in 24 December 1951 in Kalimati, Kathmandu. He was married to Subhadra Manadhar. She died in 2021 aged 68. Manadhar has  two sons and two daughters.

Participation

International events
1976 Olympic Games - 50th position in man's marathon 
1980 Olympic Games - 37th position in man's marathon
1984 Olympic Games - 46th position in man's marathon
1988 Olympic Games - 54th position in man's marathon
1983  World Championships - 43rd position in man's marathon

Awards
 Prithvi Award -2072 BS by Department of Sports 
 Pulsar Sports Life Time Achievement Award

References

External links
 

1952 births
Living people
Sportspeople from Kathmandu
Nepalese male long-distance runners
Nepalese male marathon runners
Olympic athletes of Nepal
Athletes (track and field) at the 1976 Summer Olympics
Athletes (track and field) at the 1980 Summer Olympics
Athletes (track and field) at the 1984 Summer Olympics
Athletes (track and field) at the 1988 Summer Olympics
20th-century Nepalese people